Typhoon Brenda, known in the Philippines as Tropical Storm Bining, caused significant loss of life in the Philippines and China in May 1989.

Meteorological history

A tropical depression which formed in the monsoon trough on May 14 became a tropical storm on May 16 and was named Brenda. Brenda struck Samar Island, then southern Luzon in the Philippines that day. Due to the cyclone's proximity to the Philippines, the Philippine Atmospheric, Geophysical and Astronomical Services Administration also monitored the storm and assigned it with the local name Bining.

After Brenda struck the Philippines, Brenda became a typhoon and reached a peak of  winds. After peaking, Brenda made landfall in southern China on May 20. Brenda weakened to a tropical depression and dissipated on the mext day.

Preparations and impact

Philippines
On May 16, storm warnings were issued for 20 provinces across the Philippines as Brenda approached the country. Multiple commercial vessels were kept at port until the storm passed. At least 50 domestic Philippine Airlines flights were canceled and international flights were diverted to airports not in the path of the typhoon.

Strong winds produced by Brenda caused widespread disruption from the Visayas through Luzon, downing numerous trees and power lines. Significant power disruption occurred in the Bicol Region as well as the Central Visayas. Three people were killed in Manila after a car was thrown into a bus by strong winds. On May 16, during the filming of Delta Force 2: The Colombian Connection, a helicopter crashed roughly 45 km (30 mi) south of Manila, killing five people and injuring four others. The crash was associated with strong winds from Brenda that made flying difficult.

Flooding triggered by the storm prompted officials to evacuate over 5,700 people.

Rough seas associated with the typhoon were responsible for several incidents across the Philippines. Two people drowned and thirteen others were reported missing after a motor launch capsized roughly 320 km (200 mi) east of Manila. Off the coast of Calavite Island, 23 people went missing after the cargo vessel MV Zambales sank. In Albay Province, the Corazon-II sank while berthed at the Tobaco town pier. Additionally, the five-ton vessel Albert sank off the southern tip of Luzon with five crewmen. The crew reportedly drifted at sea  for three days before tying a makeshift raft to a sea turtle which towed them to safety.

Throughout the Philippines 13–19 people were killed by the storm while another 40–53 were reported missing. A total of 652 homes were destroyed while another 4,392 were damaged. Losses from the storm amounted to 73 million pesos (US$2.86 million).

Hong Kong 

On May 20,  of rain fell in Hong Kong, marking the second-wettest day in May on record as well as the eighth-wettest day overall.

That same day in Beijing, which was in the midst of the 1989 student movement, martial law was declared. Protests in support of the Beijing movement were planned and proceeded in Hong Kong in spite of the typhoon.

In the Lam Tsuen Valley, unusually heavy rains produced by the storm triggered 31 landslides.

China

See also

Tropical Storm Cecil (1989)
Typhoon Rammasun (2014)
Tropical Storm Rumbia (2013)

References

External links
Japan Meteorological Agency
Joint Typhoon Warning Center 

1989 disasters in China
1989 Pacific typhoon season
Typhoons in China
1989 disasters in the Philippines
Typhoons in the Philippines
Typhoons